James, Jim, or Jimmy Conway may refer to:

Sports 

 James Conway (Gaelic footballer) (born 1981), Irish Gaelic football player
 James Conway (hurler), Irish hurling player
 James P. Conway (1910–1984), American Hall of Fame racehorse trainer
 Jim Conway (baseball) (1858–1912), American Major League Baseball player
 Jim Conway (footballer) (1925–2003), Australian rules football player and coach
 Jimmy Conway (footballer) (1946–2020), Irish soccer player and coach

Media and arts 

 James Conway (musician), Irish-American harmonica player
 James L. Conway (born 1950), American television director, writer, producer
 Jim Conway (musician), Australian harmonica player
 James Conway, birth name of British actor James Atherton
 Jimmy Conway, character in 1990 film Goodfellas, portrayed by Robert De Niro and based on the real life gangster James Burke

Politics 

 James F. Conway (born 1933), 41st Mayor of St. Louis, Missouri
 James Sevier Conway (1798–1855), first Governor of Arkansas
 Jim Conway (trade unionist) (1915–1974/16–1974), British trade unionist

Military 

 James T. Conway (born 1947), U.S. general, 34th Commandant of the Marine Corps
 James O. Conway (died 1954), Air National Guard pilot, see James O. Conway Memorial